Julio Navarro can refer to the following people:

Julio Navarro (astrophysicist) (born 1962), Argentine professor of astronomy
Julio Navarro (baseball) (1934–2018), Puerto Rican baseball player

See also
Julio Navarrine
Julia Navarro